Javier 'Javi' Varas Herrera (born 10 September 1982) is a Spanish former footballer who played as a goalkeeper.

He played 151 La Liga matches over eight seasons, in representation of Sevilla, Celta and Las Palmas. He added 117 appearances in the Segunda División, in a 12-year professional career.

Club career

Sevilla
Born in Seville, Andalusia, Varas arrived at Sevilla FC aged 23 after having only played amateur football in his native region (although he had been bought by the club two years earlier). He spent his first three seasons with the B team, contributing 13 games in 2006–07 as they were promoted to Segunda División for the first time ever, and occasionally training with the main squad.

After David Cobeño moved to Rayo Vallecano, Varas became Andrés Palop's backup, making his La Liga debut on 17 January 2009 in a 1–0 home win against CD Numancia. During a full month, following an injury to the latter in October, he was again called on for starting duties, only conceding once in four matches, in the 3–1 away victory over VfB Stuttgart for that campaign's UEFA Champions League.

Varas became Sevilla's first choice midway through 2010–11, over the 37-year-old Palop. He appeared in 21 games as the side finished fifth and qualified for the UEFA Europa League.

Under new manager Marcelino García Toral, Varas continued as a regular starter. On 22 October 2011, he put on a Player of the match performance against FC Barcelona, saving eight shots – including an injury-time penalty from Lionel Messi – in an eventual 0–0 away draw.

Varas lost his importance in the following years, after the arrival in January 2013 from Portuguese Beto. He made nine appearances as Sevilla won the 2013–14 Europa League, but was an unused substitute in the decisive match itself.

Valladolid
On 25 August 2014, Varas joined Real Valladolid in a one-year contract. He only missed four league matches during his first and only season, as his team narrowly missed out on play-off promotion.

Later years
On 12 July 2015, Varas signed a two-year deal with UD Las Palmas, newly promoted to the top division. On 13 June 2017, after having contributed to their consecutive permanence, the free agent returned to the second tier and his native region by agreeing to a two-year contract at Granada CF.

Varas joined SD Huesca on 19 February 2019, for the remainder of the top-flight campaign. In October, he announced his retirement at the age of 37.

Honours
Sevilla B
Segunda División B: 2006–07

Sevilla
Copa del Rey: 2009–10
UEFA Europa League: 2013–14

References

External links

1982 births
Living people
Footballers from Seville
Spanish footballers
Association football goalkeepers
La Liga players
Segunda División players
Segunda División B players
Sevilla Atlético players
CD Alcalá players
Sevilla FC players
RC Celta de Vigo players
Real Valladolid players
UD Las Palmas players
Granada CF footballers
SD Huesca footballers
UEFA Europa League winning players